Sandro Sandri (Verona, 18 February 1954) is a Venetist politician. He was a member of Liga Veneta–Lega Nord.

After a degree in engineering, Sandri worked as consultant specialized in trademarks and patents. In 1997 he joined Liga Veneta. In the 2005 regional election he was elected to the Regional Council of Veneto, but his election was declared invalid and Sandri stepped down a year later. Between 2008 and 2010 he was regional minister of Health in Galan III Government. He was elected again to the Regional Council in 2010.

References

Venetist politicians
Living people
1954 births
Members of the Regional Council of Veneto
21st-century Italian politicians